is a Japanese video game developer and character design firm based in Akasaka, Minato, Tokyo. The company developed the Kaijū Monogatari games and designs of the manga and anime series Fushigiboshi no Futagohime.

List of works

 Kaijū Monogatari (Family Computer), 1988, published by Namco
 Juvei Quest (Family Computer), 1991, published by Namco
 Dream Master (Family Computer), 1992, published by Namco
 Daikaijū Monogatari (Super Famicom), 1994, published by Hudson Soft; mobile phone port released in 2006.
 Crystal Beans: From Dungeon Explorer (Super Famicom), 1995, port of Dungeon Explorer II, published by Hudson Soft
 Daikaijuu Monogatari II (Super Famicom), 1996, published by Hudson Soft
 Elemental Gimmick Gear (Dreamcast), 1999, published by Hudson Soft
 Fushigiboshi no Futagohime, concept, 2003.
 Chamamori, handheld toys, 2006, released by Ensky
 Cocoro no Cocoron, Nintendo DS, 2011, published by Namco Bandai Games

References

External links
 Official site (Japanese)
 Fushigiboshi no Futagohime concept website (Japanese)

Video game companies of Japan
Video game development companies